Janey King (born 1947 in Denbigh, Wales) is a British journalist and romance novelist, writing under the pseudonym of Rosie Thomas. She is the author of 20 novels and ranks among the top 100 authors whose books are borrowed from United Kingdom libraries. She is a two-time winner of the Romantic Novel of the Year award.

Biography
Born Janey Morris, she grew up in a north Wales village. Her mother died when she was ten years old. She was educated at Millfield and later studied at St Hilda's College, Oxford. She worked as a journalist and in publishing before undertaking full-time writing. She drew her pseudonym from her mother's name, Rose, and her sister's married name, Thomas.

She has published numerous novels since 1982, with several of them becoming top ten bestsellers. Her books deal with the common themes of love and loss.

Awards
She is one of only a few authors to have twice won the Romantic Novel of the Year Award by the Romantic Novelists' Association. She won in 1985 for her third novel, Sunrise, and in 2007 for Iris and Ruby. In 2012 the Romantic Novelists' Association awarded Best Epic Romance of the Year to her 2011 novel, The Kashmir Shawl.

Personal
Thomas married her husband, a literary agent, after graduating university. They had two children. After their divorce in the mid-1990s, she turned to traveling and became an avid mountaineer. On her 60th birthday, she climbed the Eiger in Switzerland. She has also competed in the Peking to Paris car rally. She lives in London.

Bibliography
She has written the following works:

Novels
Celebration (1982) (known as Love's Choice in the United States)
Follies (1983)
Sunrise (1984)
The White Dove (1986)
Strangers (1987)
Bad Girls, Good Women (1988)
A Woman of Our Times (1990)
All My Sins Remembered (1991)
Other People's Marriages (1993)
A Simple Life (1995)
Every Woman Knows a Secret (1996)
Moon Island (1998)
White (2000)
The Potter's House (2001)
If My Father Loved Me (2003)
Sun at Midnight (2004)
Iris and Ruby (2006)
Constance (2007)
Lovers & Newcomers (2010)
The Kashmir Shawl (2011)
The Illusionists (2014)
Daughter of the House (2015)

Non-fiction
Border Crossing: On the Road from Peking to Paris (1998)

References

External links
Interview: 10 January 2013

1947 births
Living people
Date of birth missing (living people)
RoNA Award winners
People educated at Millfield
20th-century British novelists
21st-century British novelists
20th-century British women writers
21st-century British women writers
Women romantic fiction writers
British women novelists
People from Denbigh
Pseudonymous women writers
20th-century pseudonymous writers
21st-century pseudonymous writers